Maladie d'amour is a 1987 French drama romance film, directed by Jacques Deray. The film takes its title from the well-known song of the same name by Henri Salvador.

Cast
 Nastassja Kinski as Juliette
 Jean-Hugues Anglade as Clément Potrel
 Michel Piccoli as Raoul Bergeron
 Jean-Claude Brialy as Frédéric
 Souad Amidou as Farida
 Jean-Paul Roussillon as Jacques
 Jean-Luc Porraz as Jean-Luc
 Sophie d'Aulan as Diane
 Catherine Jacob as Nurse

References

External links

1987 films
French romantic drama films
1980s French-language films
1987 romantic drama films
Films directed by Jacques Deray
1980s French films